The following elections occurred in the year 1928.

Africa
 1928 Southern Rhodesian general election

Asia
 1928 Japanese general election
 1928 Persian legislative election
 1928 Philippine House of Representatives elections
 1928 Philippine Senate elections
 1928 Philippine legislative election

Europe
 1928 Danish Landsting election
 1928 French legislative election
 1928 German federal election
 1928 Greek legislative election
 1928 Swedish general election
 1928 Luxembourgian legislative election
 1928 Norwegian local elections
 1928 Polish legislative election
 1928 Swiss federal election

United Kingdom
 1928 Ashton-under-Lyne by-election
 1928 Carmarthen by-election
 1928 Cheltenham by-election
 1928 Halifax by-election
 1928 Lancaster by-election
 1928 Middlesbrough West by-election
 1928 St Ives by-election

United Kingdom local

English local
 1928 Southwark Borough election

North America

Canada
 1928 British Columbia general election
 1928 Edmonton municipal election
 1928 Newfoundland general election
 1928 Nova Scotia general election
 1928 Sudbury municipal election
 1928 Toronto municipal election
 1928 Yukon general election

United States
 1928 United States presidential election
 United States House of Representatives elections in California, 1928
 1928 Louisiana gubernatorial election
 1928 Minnesota gubernatorial election
 1928 New York state election
 Pineapple Primary
 United States House of Representatives elections in South Carolina, 1928
 1928 United States House of Representatives elections

United States Senate
 1928 United States Senate elections
 United States Senate election in Massachusetts, 1928

South America 
 1928 Argentine general election
 1928 Honduran general election
 1928 Nicaraguan general election
 1928 Panamanian general election
 1928 Salvadoran legislative election

Oceania

Australia
 1928 Australian federal election
 1928 Australian referendum
 1928 Tasmanian state election

New Zealand
 1928 New Zealand general election

See also
 :Category:1928 elections

1928
Elections